Linda Taylor Miller (born August 18, 1953) is an American soap opera actress.

Early life and education 
Miller was born in New Orleans, Louisiana. She was raised in Rochester, New York and also lived with her family in Fort Worth, Texas for a time. Miller moved frequently during her formative years due to her father's work as a pollution control specialist. She studied history at the H. Sophie Newcomb Memorial College at Tulane University from 1971 to 1975, joining the Chi Omega sorority.

Career
Miller modeled in New York City for a short time before she was discovered. She had her first audition for the role of Nina Cortlandt and began appearing on All My Children only  months after her arrival.

She is best known for her role as Nina Cortlandt on ABC Daytime's All My Children (AMC), which she played from 1979 to 1984 and from 1986 to 1989. Miller returned in cameos in 1994, 1995, 1996, and 2010 (40th Anniversary Episode). She returned with Gillian Spencer, who played Nina's mother, on April 20, 2010, for the tribute to Palmer Cortlandt (James Mitchell). Her pairing with Peter Bergman's Dr. Cliff Warner was arguably the first supercouple on the soap.

During a break from All My Children, she played Sally Frame on Another World (1985–1986). She also appeared in the NBC series Knight Rider.

On February 2, 2017, Miller made a surprise appearance on the Hallmark Channel's Home & Family show, where she was reunited with a number of her former All My Children castmates.

Personal life 
In 1988, Miller married Eli Tullis Jr., also a native of New Orleans. She currently resides in Chicago, Illinois. After her two children went to college, Miller was inspired to make a career transition into the health and wellness field.

Filmography

Film

Television

See also 
Cliff Warner and Nina Cortlandt

References

External links

American soap opera actresses
Actresses from New Orleans
Tulane University alumni
1953 births
Living people
American soap opera writers
Screenwriters from Louisiana
American women television writers
Women soap opera writers
21st-century American women